This is an overview of the progression of the World track cycling record of the women's team pursuit as recognised by the Union Cycliste Internationale (UCI).

The women's 3000m team pursuit discipline for 3 riders was introduced by the UCI at the 2007–08 track cycling season. After the 2012–13 track cycling season the UCI changed the discipline into a 4000 m team pursuit with 4 riders.

Joanna Rowsell Shand, has formed part of ten separate record breaking lineups across both distances, the most by any rider.

Progression

3000 m (2007–2013)

4000 m (from 2013)

References

Track cycling world record progressions
Women's team pursuit (track cycling)